Komyshivka may refer to the following places in Ukraine:

 Komyshivka, Donetsk Oblast
 Komyshivka, Odesa Oblast